The 2006 Maryland Terrapins football team represented the University of Maryland in the 2006 NCAA Division I FBS football season. It was the Terrapins' 54th season as a member of the Atlantic Coast Conference (ACC) and its second within the framework of the ACC Atlantic Division. Ralph Friedgen led the team for his sixth season as head coach, and he also served as the team's offensive play-caller. Chris Cosh served as the defensive coordinator. The Terrapins completed the season with a 9–4 record and an ACC record of 5–3.

Schedule

Rankings

Roster

Game summaries

William & Mary

Middle Tennessee

West Virginia

FIU

Georgia Tech

Virginia

NC State

Florida State

Clemson

Miami (FL)

Boston College

Wake Forest

Champs Sports Bowl vs. Purdue

2007 NFL Draft
The following players were selected in the 2007 NFL Draft.

References

Maryland
Maryland Terrapins football seasons
Cheez-It Bowl champion seasons
Maryland Terrapins football